Mahar (Devanāgarī:महर ) is a surname of Kumaoni -Khastriya Rajputs  found in Uttarakhand and West Nepal.   Mahars were given the title of chief 'Thogdar'/'Thokdar' and large part of Saur valley was referred as 'Mahar Patti'. The majority of the population is found in Pithoragarh city. 'Hilljatra' and 'Chaitol' are the key festivals of Mahar community.
Laxman Singh Mahar, Indian Freedom Fighter, and Mayukh Mahar, Indian Politician are few notable personalities of the community.

See also 
 Mahaar, a tribe of Jat origin found in Punjab

References 

Surnames of Nepalese origin
Surnames of Indian origin
Nepali-language surnames
Khas surnames
Kshatriya communities